A stone palette (also called a toilet tray) is a round tray commonly found in the areas of Bactria and Gandhara, and which usually represent Greek mythological scenes. Some of them are attributed to the Indo-Greek period in the 2nd and 1st century BCE (a few were retrieved from the Indo-Greek stratum No.5 at Sirkap.)  Many are considered to be of later production, around the 1st century CE during the time of the Indo-Parthians.  They practically disappeared after the 1st century.  Many have been found at the archaeological site of Sirkap, in today's Pakistan.

Function
Scholars have suggested that these trays were used to mix cosmetic products (cf. ancient Egyptian cosmetic palettes).  The Ancient Orient Museum was able to analyse the remains of substances adhering to a number of stone palettes, which turned out to be colored cosmetic powders akin to blush.  A frieze discovered in Butkara shows a woman using a mirror as she puts her fingers into one of these stone palettes.

These stone palettes provide an interesting instance of Hellenistic art in the northwestern Indian subcontinent.  They are disconnected from the Buddhist narrative to which works are usually associated in the Greco-Buddhist art of Gandhara.

Few of the palettes contain representations of the Buddha.

Crescent-shaped divided bowl

T-shape dividers

Other shapes

Egyptian stone palettes
Egyptians are known to have made stone palettes in the form of cups ("coupelles") with images of deities during the 2nd century CE, at the time of Roman Egypt. They variously represent Isis, Horus-Sobek, Sarapis, Harpocrates or Osiris.

See also
 Cosmetic palette

External links
 Many examples of stone palettes
 The Eclectic Museum

Notes

References
 Francfort, Henri-Paul "Les Palettes du Gandhara" 1979 (in French). Paris: Diffusion de Brocard.

History of Pakistan
Archaeological palettes
Hellenistic art